This is a list of castles and chateaux located in the South Bohemian Region of the Czech Republic.

A
 Albeř Chateau

B
 Bechyně Chateau
 Beistein Castle
 Blatná Chateau
 Borotín Castle
 Borovany Chateau
 Boršov Castle
 Brandlín Chateau
 Bratronice Chateau
 Brloh Chateau
 Březí u Týna nad Vltavou Chateau
 Budeč Chateau
 Budíškovice Chateau
 Bzí Chateau

C

 Cerhonice Chateau
 Chotoviny Chateau
 Choustník Castle
 Chřešťovice Chateau
 Čekanice Chateau
 Černice Chateau
 Červená Lhota Chateau
 Červený Dvůr Chateau
 Český Krumlov Castle
 Český Rudolec Chateau
 Čestice Chateau
 Čimelice Chateau
 Čížová Chateau
 Čkyně Chateau

D
 Dačice Chateau
 Dírná Chateau
 Dívčí Kámen Castle
 Dobronice u Bechyně Castle
 Doubravice Chateau
 Dražíč Chateau
 Drhovle Chateau
 Dřešínek Chateau
 Dříteň Chateau
 Dub Chateau

H

 Haselburg Castle
 Hausberk Castle
 Helfenburk Castle
 Hluboká nad Vltavou Chateau
 Hněvkovice Chateau
 Hrad na Stožecké skále Castle
 Hrádek u Purkarce Castle
 Hus Castle

J
 Jemčina Chateau
 Jindřichův Hradec Castle

K
 Kardašova Řečice Castle
 Kardašova Řečice Chateau
 Karlov Chateau
 Kestřany Chateau
 Koloděje nad Lužnicí Chateau
 Komařice Chateau
 Kozí Hrádek Castle
 Kratochvíle Chateau
 Křikava Castle
 Kuglvajt Castle
 Kunžvart Castle

L
 Landštejn Castle
 Lčovice Chateau
 Ledenice Castle
 Libějovice - Starý zámek Chateau
 Lnáře Chateau
 Lom Castle
 Louzek Castle
 Lustenek Chateau
 Lžín Chateau

M
 Maříž Chateau
 Maškovec Castle
 Měšice Castle
 Mladá Vožice Castle
 Myšenec Castle

N
 Nadějkov Chateau
 Nemyšl Chateau
 Neznašov Chateau
 Němčice Chateau
 Nová Bystřice Chateau
 Nová Včelnice Chateau
 Nové Hrady Castle
 Nový zámek Chateau

O

 Ohrada Chateau
 Olešnice Chateau
 Oltyně Chateau
 Omlenička Chateau
 Opařany Castle
 Orlík nad Vltavou Castle
 Osek Chateau
 Ostrolovský Újezd Chateau

P
 Písečné Chateau
 Písek Castle
 Pluhův Žďár Chateau
 Poděhusy Castle
 Pomezí Castle
 Pořešín Castle
 Poříčí Chateau
 Přečín Chateau
 Příběnice Castle
 Příběničky Castle
 Protivín Chateau

R
 Radenín Chateau
 Rožmberk Castle
 Rudolfov Chateau

S
 Sedlice Chateau
 Soběslav Castle
 Sokolčí Castle
 Staré Hobzí Chateau
 Stádlec Chateau
 Strakonice Castle
 Střela Castle
 Střela Chateau
 Stráž nad Nežárkou Chateau
 Studená Chateau
 Šelmberk Castle
 Škvořetice Chateau
 Štěchovice Chateau
 Štěkeň Chateau

T
 Tábor Castle
 Trhové Sviny Castle
 Třeboň Chateau
 Tučapy Chateau
 Tůmův vrch Chateau
 Týn nad Vltavou Castle
 Týn nad Vltavou Chateau

U
 Údolský Hrádek Castle

V
 Varvažov Chateau
 Velešín Castle
 Veselíčko Chateau
 Vimperk Chateau
 Vitějovice Castle
 Vítkův Hrádek Castle
 Vlachovo Březí Chateau
 Vodice Chateau
 Vráž Chateau

Z
 Zálší Chateau
 Zdíkov Chateau
 Zvíkov Castle

See also
 List of castles in the Czech Republic
 List of castles in Europe
 List of castles

External links 
 Castles, Chateaux, and Ruins 
 Czech Republic - Manors, Castles, Historical Towns
 Hrady.cz 

 
South Bohemia